European Jews for a Just Peace (EJJP)  is a federation of Jewish groups in ten European countries aimed at bringing about peace in the Middle East and ensuring respect for the human rights of the Palestinian people. One of the claims of EJJP is Israel's immediate withdrawal from the occupied territories.

History
The organisation was founded in Amsterdam in September 2002. Its principles are contained in its Amsterdam Declaration of 2002, amended in 2004. These are: 

the condemnation of all violence against civilians in the conflict, no matter by whom it is carried out
the recognition of Israel's 1967 'green line' borders
commitment to the Palestinians' right to a state in the territories currently occupied by Israel in the West Bank, East Jerusalem and Gaza
the recognition of the right of both states to have Jerusalem as their capital
calling on Israel to acknowledge its part in the creation of the Palestinian refugee problem and its obligation to negotiate a just, fair and practical resolution of the issue.

In an opinion article published in The Guardian in February 2009, Antony Lerman, the former (2006-2009) director of the Institute for Jewish Policy Research considers that Jewish peace groups like European Jews for a Just Peace and Independent Jewish Voices in Canada and Australia "may have a moderating influence on Israel" as "Israel is heavily dependent on what Jews think".

In September 2010, EJJP organized a Gaza-bound aid boat, the "Jewish Boat to Gaza", carrying nine Jewish activists. It was intercepted by the Israel Defense Forces and led to the port of Ashdod.

The EJJP chairperson, Dror Feiler, an Israel-born Swedish national, was again aboard the French Dignité-Al Karama ship in the 2011 flotilla for Gaza.

Member organizations
Austria: Jüdische Stimme für gerechten Frieden in Nahost (Jewish Voice for a Just Peace in the Near East)
Belgium: Union des progressistes juifs de Belgique
Denmark: European Jews for a Just Peace - Denmark
France: Union juive française pour la paix (Jewish French Union for Peace)
Germany: Jüdische Stimme für gerechten Frieden in Nahost (Jewish Voice for a Just Peace in the Near East)
Italy: Rete Ebrei contro l'occupazione ("Rete ECO", Italian Network of Jews Against the Occupation)
the Netherlands: Een Ander Joods Geluid (A Different Jewish Voice)
Sweden: Judar för israelisk-palestinsk fred (Jews for Israeli–Palestinian Peace)
Switzerland: Jüdische Stimme für einen gerechten Frieden zwischen Israel und Palästina (Jewish Voice for a Just Peace between Israel and Palestine)
the United Kingdom: Jewish Socialists' Group and Jews for Justice for Palestinians

References

External links
  

Jewish anti-occupation groups
International organizations based in Europe
Non-governmental organizations involved in the Israeli–Palestinian peace process
Jews and Judaism in Europe